Halo, Halo Bandung is an Indonesian patriotic song written by Ismail Marzuki that describes the spirit of the struggle of the people of the city of Bandung in the post-independence period in 1946, particularly in the Bandung Sea of Fire that occurred on March 23, 1946.

Background 

Ismail Marzuki, then a singer and songwriter of keroncong groups Lief Java, performed regularly with the group by the mid 1930s at Studio Orkes NIROM II in Tegalega, Bandung, as part of the NIROM station's Eastern Programme. Having returned to Batavia after marrying fellow singer of the groups, Eulis Zuraidah, the sentimental memories and sweet reminiscences of the city was well maintained in his mind. These recollections led him to wrote a song called "Hallo Bandung" in the Sundanese language, as well as other songs such as "Bandung Selatan di Waktu Malam" and "Saputangan dari Bandung Selatan". The phrase "Hallo Bandoeng" was well known at that time as the call-sign and usual opening used by Radio Kootwijk when establishing a radio-telegraphic connection with Bandung (in Dutch: "Bandoeng"), one of the largest cities in the then Dutch East Indies. It was made famous by Queen Consort Emma when she officially opened the radiotelephone service from Koninklijke PTT Nederland main building in The Hague on January 7, 1929 with the words "Hallo Bandoeng… Hier Den Haag". It quickly escalated even further as a catchphrase since the release of Dutch song "Hallo Bandoeng" by Willy Derby which sold more than 50,000 copies, a remarkable number at that time.

This early version of the song lyrics indicated that it was not meant to be a war-related-marching song but simply a sentimental-yearning song. During Japanese invasion, the song was translated into Indonesian language as part of Japanese propaganda which included the elimination of any Dutch influences and promote the use of Indonesian language throughout the country. However, this second version was still reflected its original meaning as a nostalgia song.

Following the surrender of the Japanese in the Dutch East Indies, Indonesian nationalists fought a four-year war of independence against Dutch NICA and initially British Commonwealth forces, a period known as the Indonesian National Revolution. Early in this period Ismail Marzuki and his wife had to evacuate to Bandung to escape from British-Dutch occupation in Jakarta. Unfortunately after they settled in Bandung, an ultimatum was given by the British force for the Indonesian combatants in Bandung to leave the city. In response, the southern part of Bandung was deliberately burned down in an act of defiance as they left on 24 March 1946; an event which came to be known as Bandung Lautan Api (or Bandung Sea of Fire). This incident inspired Ismail Marzuki, as well as many Indonesian combatants and refugees, to alter the last two sentences of the song lyrics to become more patriotic and be able to boost their fighting spirit against British-Dutch forces. Soon after, the song Halo, Halo Bandung became very famous and emerged as a symbol of the struggle of the Indonesian people in their fight for independence from colonial foreign nations.

Lyrics

References

Folk
Indonesian patriotic songs
1946 songs